Connor Donehue (born May 9, 1996) is an American-born rugby league footballer who plays as a  or , most recently playing for the Brooklyn Kings in the NARL.

Background
Donehue was born in Torrance, California. His father John, a Brazilian jiu-jitsu black belt from Australia, was living in California at the time. Donehue moved to Melbourne as a child when his father took a job with the Melbourne Storm as a defensive coach.

Playing career
Donehue began his rugby league career coming through the Melbourne Storm system and eventually played for the Sunshine Coast Falcons in the Queensland Cup. In 2019 he joined the Brooklyn Kings, where they won 2019 USA Rugby League Championship final. He represented the United States in the 2019 Rugby League World Cup 9s.

References

External links
Connor Donehue @USARL

1996 births
American rugby league players
American people of Australian descent
United States national rugby league team players
Brooklyn Kings players
Sunshine Coast Falcons players
Rugby league halfbacks
Rugby league hookers
Living people
Australian rugby league players
Sportspeople from Torrance, California
American emigrants to Australia
Rugby league players from Melbourne